Poison Ivy (Pamela Lillian Isley  ) is a character appearing in American comic books published by DC Comics, commonly in Batman stories. She was created by Robert Kanigher and Carmine Infantino, and first appeared in Batman #181 (June 1966). 

Poison Ivy is a misanthropic botanist and biochemist who possesses a poisonous touch, enhanced physical abilities, and a supernatural control over plant life. Empowered by the interplanetary force known as the Green, she uses her powers for the purposes of ecoterrorism. She is typically drawn barefoot in a one-piece costume adorned with leaves and vines, with occasional variations to her skin tone. Originally characterized as a supervillain, she has periodically been depicted as an antiheroine as of The New 52 and DC Rebirth. Poison Ivy is one of Batman's most enduring enemies, belonging to the collective of adversaries who make up his rogues gallery. 

She has been featured in many media adaptations related to Batman. Uma Thurman portrayed the character in Batman & Robin. Clare Foley, Maggie Geha, and Peyton List played her in Gotham, while Bridget Regan portrayed her in the third season of the Arrowverse series Batwoman. She was voiced by Diane Pershing in the DC Animated Universe, Piera Coppola on The Batman animated series, Tasia Valenza for the Batman: Arkham video game franchise, Riki Lindhome in The Lego Batman Movie, and Lake Bell in Harley Quinn.

Publication history
Poison Ivy was created by Robert Kanigher and Carmine Infantino, the character first appeared in Batman #181 (June 1966). Infantino discussed how the character was created "The only reason she came about was because of Catwoman on the Batman show. They wanted more female villains. What was the other one I did.. the Silver Fox! And then Batgirl. That show, because of it we were selling a million copies a month. But that show, when it died, so did the comic books."

Poison Ivy's origin is depicted in Neil Gaiman's short story "Pavane" (Secret Origins #36, 1988), during which she declares herself to be nature's daughter and the world's rightful ruler; it is later revealed that her powers were gifted to her by the environmental force known as the Green. Ivy is considered extremely beautiful within the DC Universe, and is often presented as a temptress. She is typically depicted barefoot with long flowing hair, plant vines extending over her limbs, and a green one-piece suit adorned with leaves, with occasional variations to her skin tone.

Writer J. T. Krul, who helped further define Poison Ivy's personality, summed up her character with the following quote: 

After appearing in various DC Comics publications, Poison Ivy starred in her first solo comic book series with the 2016 miniseries Poison Ivy: Cycle of Life and Death. This was followed by the 2021 graphic novel Poison Ivy: Thorns, and the eponymously titled Poison Ivy, an ongoing comic book series first published in 2022. The character also co-starred in the miniseries Harley Quinn and Poison Ivy (20192020).

Fictional character biography

Pre-Crisis
Dr. Pamela Lillian Isley, PhD is a promising botanist who is persuaded by Marc LeGrand into assisting him with the theft of an Egyptian artifact containing ancient herbs. Fearing she would implicate him in the theft, he attempts to poison her with the herbs, which are deadly and untraceable. She survives this murder attempt and discovers she has acquired an immunity to all natural toxins and diseases.

Post-Crisis
Following the events of the DC maxi-series comic Crisis on Infinite Earths, which massively retconned DC Universe history and continuity, Poison Ivy's origins were revised in Secret Origins #36, 1988, written by Neil Gaiman. Poison Ivy's real name is Dr. Pamela Lillian Isley, PhD, a Gotham City botanist. She grows up wealthy with emotionally distant parents and later studies advanced botanical biochemistry at a university with Alec Holland under Dr. Jason Woodrue. Isley, a shy girl, is easily seduced by her professor. Woodrue injects Isley with poisons and toxins as an experiment, causing her transformation. She nearly dies twice as a result of these poisonings, driving her insane. Later, Woodrue flees from the authorities leaving Isley in the hospital for six months. Enraged at the betrayal, she suffers from violent mood swings, being sweet one moment and evil the next. When her boyfriend has a car accident after mysteriously suffering from a massive fungal overgrowth, Isley drops out of school and leaves Seattle, eventually settling in Gotham City.

She begins her criminal career by threatening to release her suffocating spores into the air unless the city meets her demands. Batman, who appears in Gotham that very same year, thwarts her scheme, and she is incarcerated in Arkham Asylum. From this point on, she has a kind of obsession with Batman, him being the only person she could not control due to his strong will and focus. Over the years, she develops plant-like superpowers, the most noticeable being a lethal toxin in her lips; she is literally able to kill with a kiss.

In subsequent issues, she states that she only started a life of crime to attain sufficient funds to find a location to be alone with her plants, undisturbed by humanity. A few years later, she attempts to leave Gotham forever, escaping Arkham to settle on a desert island in the Caribbean. She transforms the barren wasteland into a second Eden, and is, for the first time in her life, happy. It is soon firebombed, however, when an American-owned corporation tests their weapons systems out on what they think is an abandoned island. Ivy returns to Gotham with a vengeance, punishing those responsible. After being willingly apprehended by Batman, she resolves that she can never leave Gotham, at least not until the world was safe for plants. From then on, she dedicates herself to the impossible mission of "purifying" Gotham.

At one point, Batman travels to Seattle to ascertain information on Pamela Isley's life before she became Poison Ivy. Here, Batman states that both of Pamela's parents are dead. When and why they died has been left undetermined.

While in Arkham, Poison Ivy receives a message through flowers that someone is to help her escape. That night, two women, Holly and Eva, successfully break Ivy out and bring her back to their employer. She is less than happy to discover that it is the Floronic Man, formerly known as Dr. Jason Woodrue, her former college professor that conducted the experiments on her. The only human portion of him remaining is his head, while the rest of his body is plant-based.

After striking a deal with him in the tunnels of Gotham, Ivy receives a trunk full of money in return for samples of her DNA. Woodrue intends to combine their DNA to create a "child", all while flooding the streets of Gotham with high-grade marijuana. The purpose of this is to create a world economy run on hemp and to have their offspring control it. Batman intervenes, but is overcome by Woodrue's henchwomen, Holly and Eva. However, Ivy turns on Floronic Man and lets Batman go to fight the intoxicated maniac. In the end, Batman decapitates the Floronic Man, and Ivy escapes with her money.

At times, Ivy demonstrates positive and maternal traits. When Gotham City is destroyed in an earthquake and declared No Man's Land, she holds dominion over Robinson Park and turns it into a tropical paradise rather than fight over territory like most of Batman's enemies. Sixteen children who are orphaned during the quake come to live with her as she sympathizes with them having suffered a traumatic childhood herself. She cares for them like sons and daughters, despite her usual misanthropy. That winter, Clayface (Basil Karlo) pays Ivy a visit, hoping to form a bargain with her. This would entail her growing fruits and vegetables, having the orphans harvest them, and him selling the produce to the highest bidder. She wants nothing to do with the plan, and she attempts to kill him with a kiss. Clayface overpowers her, however, and imprisons Ivy and the orphans for six months in a chamber under the park's lake. He feeds her salt and keeps her from the sun to weaken her. Eventually, Batman comes and discovers the imprisoned orphans and Ivy. The two agree to work together to take Karlo down. Batman battles Clayface and instructs Robin to blow up the lake bed above, allowing the rushing water to break apart the mud, effectively freeing Ivy. She fights Karlo, ensnaring him in the branches of a tree and fatally kissing him. She then proceeds to sink him down into the ground, where he becomes fertilizer for Ivy's plants. Batman, originally intending to take the orphans away from Ivy, recognizes that staying with her is what is best for them, and they remain in her care until the city is restored. Also, as part of a bargain to keep her freedom, Batman arranges it so that Ivy provides fresh produce to the starving hordes of earthquake survivors. Soon after, Ivy finds Harley Quinn, who had almost been murdered by the Joker, among the debris of the earthquake and nurses her back to health. The two have been best friends and partners-in-crime ever since.

After Gotham City is reopened to the public, the city council wants to evict her from the park and send her back to Arkham Asylum, as they are uncomfortable with the thought of a "psychotic eco-terrorist controlling the equivalent of 30-odd square blocks." They also mistakenly believe that the orphans in Ivy's care are hostages. The Gotham City Police Department threaten to spray the park with R.C. Sixty, a powerful herbicide that most certainly would have killed every living plant in the park, including Ivy, and more than likely do harm to the children. Ivy refuses to leave the park to the city and let them destroy the paradise she had created, so she chooses martyrdom. It is only after Rose, one of the orphans, is accidentally poisoned by Ivy that the hardened eco-terrorist surrenders herself to the authorities to save the girl's life. Batman says that, as much as she would hate to admit it, Ivy is still more human than plant.

Later on, she and other Gotham characters are manipulated by the Riddler and Hush. Her task is to hypnotize both Superman and Catwoman, using Catwoman to steal ransom money from Bane after the original plan is interrupted by Batman while Superman serves as a 'bodyguard' when she hides in Metropolis. However, she abandons Catwoman to be killed by Killer Croc, and Batman is able to keep Superman busy in a fight (aided by the Kryptonite ring he was given long ago) long enough for the Man of Steel to break out of the spell. Soon afterwards, the Riddler, who is being chased and attacked by Hush, approaches Ivy and seeks her protection. Ivy, who is angered by the manipulation, battles the Riddler physically and psychologically. She comes to physically dominate her opponent, humiliating Riddler and temporarily breaking his spirit.

Poison Ivy comes to believe that her powers are killing the children she had looked after, so she seeks Bruce Wayne's help to reverse her powers and make her a normal human being once more. Soon after, she is convinced by Hush to take another serum to restore her powers and apparently dies in the process. However, in Batman: Gotham Knights, when her grave is visited shortly thereafter, it is covered with ivy, creating the impression her death would be short-lived.

Shortly after, Poison Ivy appears briefly in Robinson Park, killing two corrupt cops who killed one of her orphans (although whether this takes place before or after the aforementioned storyline is unknown).

"One Year Later", Ivy is alive and active. Her control over flora has increased, referred to as being on a par with Swamp Thing or Floronic Man. She also appears to have resumed her crusade against the corporate enemies of the environment with a new fanaticism, regarding Batman no longer as a main opponent, but as a "hindrance". After arriving back from a year-long absence, Batman discovers that Ivy has been feeding people including "tiresome lovers", "incompetent henchmen", and those who "returned her smile" to a giant plant which would digest the victims slowly and painfully. She refers to these murders as a "guilty pleasure". In an unprecedented event, her victims' souls merge with the plant, creating a botanical monster called Harvest, who seeks revenge upon Poison Ivy. With the intervention of Batman however, she is saved. Poison Ivy is left in critical condition, and the whereabouts of Harvest are unknown.

Other storylines
In Countdown #37, the Pied Piper and the Trickster are hiding out in a greenhouse, picking fruits and vegetables from the plants. They run into Ivy, who is talking to her plants (presumably being told that Piper and Trickster hurt them), to which she reacts by tying them up in vines with the intention of killing them. She is then shown to have joined the Injustice League Unlimited and is one of the villains featured in Salvation Run.

In the "Battle for the Cowl" storyline, she is coerced by a new Black Mask into joining his group of villains that aims to take over Gotham. She and Killer Croc unsuccessfully attempt to murder Damian Wayne.

Shortly after, she escapes from Black Mask's control and forms an alliance with Catwoman and Harley Quinn, leading into the ongoing series Gotham City Sirens.

During Hush's ploy to hurt Batman through hurting his loved ones, Hush kidnaps Catwoman and surgically removes her heart. After being saved by Batman, Catwoman is operated on by some of the most gifted surgeons in the world, including Doctor Mid-Nite and Mr. Terrific. Zatanna also gives her a magic antidote to help heal her wounds. To get even with Hush, Selina enlists the help of Poison Ivy, Harley Quinn, Oracle, Holly Robinson, and Slam Bradley to track down all of Hush's accounts, pilfer them, and leave him penniless. Selina pays Holly, Harley, and Ivy over $30 million each, hoping that they would use the funds to leave Gotham to start fresh somewhere else. However, Harley uses her money to go on a shopping spree, while Ivy gives her money away to organizations in Madagascar and Costa Rica dedicated to reforestation.

After rescuing Catwoman from Boneblaster, a new villain trying to make a name for himself, Poison Ivy takes Catwoman back to the Riddler's townhouse. When there, Catwoman sees that Ivy has been keeping the Riddler under mind control so that she and Harley could use his townhouse as a hideout. Here, Catwoman decides that with Gotham City more dangerous than ever with all the gang wars and a new Batman, a partnership with the other two women would be advantageous. However, Ivy fears that Catwoman has lost her edge and prowess, and consults with Zatanna on the nature of Catwoman's injuries. Zatanna responds that Catwoman has psychological wounds that would need healing. Ivy resolves that she and Harley would provide Catwoman with "positive female reinforcement". The three then agree to become a team. However, Harley and Ivy have one condition that Catwoman is to reveal to them Batman's secret identity.

Eventually, Ivy and the other Sirens ambush the Riddler at his office (with Ivy using her plants to truss and gag his secretary), telling him that they've been framed for the murder of a young nurse. He agrees to help clear their names, and during the discussion Ivy reveals that she has recently taken up a job at the Gotham division of S.T.A.R. Labs under an assumed name (Dr. Paula Irving). She is eventually kidnapped and placed in a specialized containment unit by a researcher named Alisa Adams, but escapes and turns the table on her captor by binding her with vines. Ivy initially informs Adams that she plans to kill her, but instead decides to let her live after seeing a photograph of Alisa's young daughter. Ivy then threatens Alisa into keeping her mouth shut about her true identity, telling her that she will change her mind and kill her if she reveals her secret to anyone.

When Harley Quinn betrays her friends and breaks into Arkham Asylum with the goal of killing the Joker, she ultimately chooses instead to release Joker from his cell, and together the two orchestrate a violent takeover of the facility. Poison Ivy arrives and tries to convince Harley Quinn that the Joker is evil, but Harley Quinn refuses to believe her and knocks Poison Ivy unconscious. After they are defeated by Catwoman and Batman, Catwoman then tells Poison Ivy that they are no longer friends, after Ivy had drugged Catwoman in an attempt to discover Batman's identity. Poison Ivy is taken to Arkham Asylum. Ivy soon escapes and ambushes Harley in her cell, binding and gagging her former friend before she can defend herself. Ivy struggles with the decision to execute Harley for her betrayal, but ultimately releases her after realizing that she is still her friend. Together, the two set off to find Catwoman and make her pay for leaving them behind. The two of them find Catwoman and fight her on the streets. While fighting, Catwoman confesses that she saw good in the both of them and only wanted to help them. When she tells them that she only kept tabs on them because Batman wanted to keep them under control, Ivy lashes out onto the city by using giant vines to destroy buildings, cursing at Batman for manipulating her. Batman is about to arrest them, but Catwoman helps the two of them escape.

The New 52
In 2011, "The New 52" rebooted the DC universe. Poison Ivy is recruited into the covert-ops group known as the Birds of Prey. Though she is specifically hand-picked by the team's leader, Black Canary, the other members of the group protest Ivy's inclusion, citing her violent past and connections to various murders. These suspicions are proven correct when Ivy poisons the team and forces them to attack corrupt companies she wants to destroy, until Katana apparently kills her.

Ivy survives the injuries and returns to Gotham, breaking out Clayface/Basil Karlo to manipulate him into becoming her husband. Batman intervenes to help her, mainly because the locations she attacked were the Penguin's properties. Poison Ivy ends up captured by Penguin's men. She is buried alive by them, but survives long enough to be rescued by Penguin's right-hand man Emperor Penguin who has taken over his boss' businesses after the Joker's return. He proposes an alliance with her. However, Karlo, whom Batman had set free from Ivy's control, tracks down and attacks Poison Ivy. Emperor Penguin later calls in a favor from Poison Ivy. This led to Emperor Penguin empowering himself with a chemical that is made from one of Poison Ivy's plant concoctions, the Man-Bat Serum, and the Venom drug.

The character's origin, in this new DC universe, was presented in a special issue of Detective Comics (#23.1), during the "Villains Month" event in September 2013. Pamela Isley was born with a skin condition that prevented her from leaving her home. She spent most of her limited time outside in her family's garden. Her abusive father murdered her mother and buried her in the garden. While in college, Pamela sold pheromone pills to other students to study its effects until she was caught by police. She used a powerful version of the pills to control the dean's mind so he would drop the charges and let her graduate with honors. While visiting her father in prison, she kissed him, and the poison that was secreted from her lips killed him. Later she landed an internship in Wayne Enterprises' Bio-Chemistry division developing pharmaceutical and cosmetic applications. She was fired after suggesting to Bruce Wayne that the company develop chemicals that could brainwash people. As she was escorted out by security, she accidentally spilled the chemicals she was working with on herself, giving her powers to control plant life and immunity to all poisons and viruses.

Cycle of Life and Death

In January 2016, DC Comics debuted Ivy's first solo comic book series, Poison Ivy: Cycle of Life and Death. As Dr. Pamela Isley, PhD, she joins the plant sciences department at Gotham Botanical Gardens, but things quickly get complicated when Luisa Cruz, Ivy's friend and mentor, is murdered via poisoning. Ivy investigates the murder whilst working on her genetic engineering research that culminates in the creation of two plant-human hybrid children known as Rose and Hazel.

With the help of Selina Kyle and fellow researcher Darshan, Poison Ivy finds that the Gotham Botanical Gardens are performing experiments, using Ivy's research, which result in the creation of another plant-human hybrid child known as Thorn. Ivy destroys the laboratory and rescues the child. Ivy raises Rose, Hazel and Thorn who grow to adult size at an exponential rate, becoming young women within 35 weeks. When the girls sneak out to see Gotham City at night for the first time, they cause an incident at a strip club that gets the police involved, and Ivy has to help them escape.

Returning to the apartment, Ivy locks Rose, Hazel and Thorn away so they will not leave again. Ivy finds Doctor Eric Grimley, Chair of the Gotham Botanical Gardens Research Department, waiting for her. Grimley had been conducting experiments with Ivy's research to cure his own cancer; he had then murdered Luisa because she was suspicious of the experiments he was performing. Now, with his cancer returning, he intends to harvest Rose, Thorn, and Hazel for spores to be used as another cure. He attacks Ivy, and transforms into a giant, plant-like monster. Darshan arrives and releases the girls. Ivy, Rose, Hazel, Thorn, and Darshan, along with Swamp Thing (who seeks to kill Grimley for trying to break the cycle of life and death) fight and defeat Grimley, with Thorn hacking him up with a machete.

Darshan later helps Rose, Thorn, and Hazel leave Ivy, reasoning that they were getting so restless they would go eventually with or without his help. They set off away from Gotham to places unknown, saying they plan to live out their lives regardless of how short they may be.

DC Universe
DC Comics began the next relaunch of its entire line of titles, called "DC Rebirth", in June 2016. DC opted to rebrand its titles under the "DC Universe" name in December 2017, using the continuity established from DC Rebirth. In the "Better Together" story arc of Trinity, Poison Ivy finds a dreamworld and the White Mercy entity, both created by the Black Mercy plant for Mongul, through her connection to the Green. After capturing Batman, Wonder Woman, and Superman, she places them into the dreamworld and intends to use the solar energy emitted from Superman's body to open a gateway to bring the White Mercy—whom she considers as a daughter—over from the dreamworld. It is later revealed that Mongul deceived Poison Ivy and intended to conquer Earth using Superman as a vessel. Mongul is defeated by the White Mercy, using Batman as a temporary and willing vessel. As Poison Ivy and the White Mercy bid farewell to each other, the White Mercy uses her connection to the Green to make Poison Ivy lose her memories of the incident, so Ivy doesn't need to suffer any heartache. In the continuity, the "Better Together" story arc takes place after the events in Poison Ivy: Cycle of Life and Death involving Ivy's children.

In Batgirl, Poison Ivy helps Batgirl save an airplane and its passengers from a plant, one of Ivy's specimen, that is growing uncontrollably in the cargo bay. In the end, she reluctantly allows Batgirl to kill it.

In the "Ends of the Earth" arc of All-Star Batman, Poison Ivy goes into Death Valley where she conducts research on a barren tree to discover cures. Here, Batman asks Poison Ivy for help with a deadly bacteria, which was unleashed by Mr. Freeze, informing her about an infected girl and giving her samples of it. Upon examining it, Ivy realizes that the infected girl is already dead and Batman wanted to evoke her sympathy as he is actually seeking for a cure to combat the spread of the disease. She also reveals that, when she was still working at Wayne Enterprises, she had presented her research wrongly as she thought Bruce Wayne wanted something to manipulate people but she was actually researching pheromones to make people feel good. Batman warns Ivy that an unknown strike force is after her, because they know Ivy is able to pull biological weapons from the tree. After Batman helps Ivy in the fight, Ivy synthesizes a selective agent that can destroy the spores without harming the hosts.

In "The War of Jokes and Riddles" story arc of Batman, Poison Ivy has allied herself with the Riddler in his war against the Joker. In the arc, when the Riddler was trying to convince her to join his side, she is seen stopping Carmine Falcone's men—who are sent to kill the Riddler—by capturing them in vines.

In the "Gotham Resistance" tie-in story arc for Dark Nights: Metal, Poison Ivy controls a jungle-like realm within a Gotham City warped by the dark energy emitted from the dark metal in the cards given by the Batman Who Laughs to various enemies of Batman including Poison Ivy herself. Poison Ivy captures Harley Quinn—who realizes that Poison Ivy isn't herself—Green Arrow, Nightwing, Robin, and Killer Croc as they try to solve what's going on and stop it. They escape when Poison Ivy violently reacts to her plants being harmed during an attack by several members of the Teen Titans and Suicide Squad, who all also have been twisted, as well as a Dark Robin.

In the "Source Code" story arc of Batgirl and the Birds of Prey, Poison Ivy infiltrates and tries to take down Terracare, a company whose fertilizers contain a secret ingredient destructive to bee populations. She comes across the Birds of Prey (Huntress, Black Canary, and Batgirl) and Catwoman who were trying to save the Calculator's family held hostage by Terracare. Terracare had namely traced back a data breach to the Calculator who sold the information to Catwoman, so she could steal a vial of the ingredient from Terracare for Poison Ivy. She did this for Ivy, as Ivy once saved her from Boneblaster. After they stopped those responsible at Terracare, Batgirl arranges that Poison Ivy becomes the chemist in charge of the fertilizers. After this arc, Poison Ivy is occasionally seen working at Terracare (now acquired by Gordon Clean Energy) or helping the Birds of Prey against villains (such as the Daughters of Gotham or the Calculator).

In the "Unnatural Disaster" storyline of Damage, Poison Ivy has fallen under the influence of forces that led to a desire to destroy humanity. She partnered with Gorilla Grodd for that purpose. They fought against Damage (Ethan Avery) who is trying to protect people from them. However, Poison Ivy eventually resists the control of these forces, as she thinks that people are worth saving and doesn't want to be a killer. At the end, Swamp Thing (Alec Holland) reveals to Ethan Avery that the Green is trying to change Poison Ivy but hasn't succeeded.

Batman (vol. 3) #41–43 features a Poison Ivy arc titled "Everyone Loves Ivy". Fueled by her guilt over the men she thought she killed in "The War of Jokes and Riddles", Poison Ivy uses her powers to take control of everyone on earth, except Batman and Catwoman. With the help of Harley Quinn, Batman and Catwoman convince Poison Ivy to release the world from her control. At the end of arc, Poison Ivy enters a facility known as the Sanctuary for rehabilitation.

In Heroes in Crisis, at the mental health institution Sanctuary, Poison Ivy is seen giving a confession in which she states that she shouldn't be there because they are made for heroes and she is a terrorist. Earlier, Harley Quinn had told Poison Ivy to go to Sanctuary and followed her there. Ivy and several others are killed when Wally West loses control of the Speed Force, but Wally revives Ivy from the Green by using the Speed Force on a rose that was a part of Ivy given to Harley. The following Harley Quinn and Poison Ivy limited series shows Ivy still struggling to completely regenerate. With Harley's aid, Ivy is eventually restored fully, but accidentally creates an identical plant duplicate of herself during her recovery. Both innocently unaware of being a duplicate, the Ivy-double and Harley go on the run together when enemies attack, leaving behind the real Ivy feeling abandoned and betrayed. By the time the pair learn of their mistake, Ivy is murderously insane towards Harley, forcing the double to sacrifice herself to save Harley and stabilize Ivy's sanity.

Harley Quinn comic
Harley Quinn features Ivy as Harley's best friend and then lover. Ivy has helped Harley out on several adventures between her ecological terrorism gigs back in Harley's new home on Coney Island. She helps Harley explain to the local assassins that Harley posted her own bounty while sleepwalking and that trying to kill her would just lead to their deaths and no pay day. Harley rescued her from a super villain's mind control while Ivy was secretly held prisoner and used by said villain in Arkham. She assisted in hiring the Gang of Harleys and nursing Harley back to health when Captain Strong's mutant possibly alien seaweed put her in the hospital. She and Catwoman joined Harley on a road trip when Harley's uncle died and found that while both she and Harley are immune to most toxins, that does not include some secret drink brewed up on an Indian reservation. She and Harley were invited to spend a romantic week in Bermuda on a nudist colony by Sy Borgman. When there was a dispute over some real estate Ivy helped turn it into protected swampland. Also, when the Penguin attacks New York with giant killer penguins, she helps defeat him by growing a giant daisy in what their friend Eggy calls "the worst Kaiju fight ever."

Activism
Ivy calls herself an "ecoterrorist of global importance" and has demonstrated philanthropic contributions to conservation efforts. The Gotham Girls episode "Pave Paradise" has her going out of her way to get Gotham's mayor to prevent bulldozing of a park because he swore he would not do it in his election campaign. In Gotham City Sirens, Ivy reveals that she donated her $30 million share of Hush's money to a reforestation fund.

Powers and abilities
Initially thought to have been transformed by human experiments, Isley is later revealed to be gifted by the Green, an interplanetary force which grants her a supernatural control over plant life, enhanced strength and stamina, the power to transfer poison through touch, complete immunity to all toxins and poisons, and the ability to project mind-controlling pheromones. With the latter power at its full potential, she proves capable of controlling every person on Earth, including other super-powered beings. If her mind-control spores are laced with Kryptonite, Ivy can affect and control Superman as well.

She has the ability to control and mutate all forms of plant life on a molecular level, making it respond to her will and command. In volume three of Batman, she causes giant plant roots to become uprooted at a moment's notice, and directs them to entangle her enemies. While in Arkham Asylum, she manipulates and animates plants, using roots to form supports for a tunnel she and another inmate named Magpie dig to escape, and also spawning glowing fungi to entertain Magpie. Plant vines are also commonly seen extending over her limbs and neck, creating part of her overall appearance. She controlled an entire tree to come down on Clayface, ensnaring him in its branches, and once brought a whole skyscraper down with giant vines. 

Some versions of the character depict her as more plant than human, such as breathing carbon dioxide and undergoing photosynthesis. Her special pheromones let her mesmerize and manipulate people around her, men in particular, although strong-minded people like Batman are usually capable of resisting. She can also create the most potent floral toxins in Gotham City, ranging from truth serums to love potions. Often these toxins are secreted from her lips and administered in her preferred way, a poisonous kiss. Ironically her immunity to poisons has resulted in her becoming sterile and unable to give birth.

Poison Ivy is identified by the Swamp Thing as a being with an elemental mystical component, whom he calls the "May Queen". Ivy is able to communicate over great distances with this talent, as she manifests in a vase of roses in Zatanna's dressing room to talk to the magician. Since her death and rebirth, her control over plants increased to the point she can grow giant animated plants from seedlings in seconds, hear through plants, and channel her consciousness into plant material from long distances.

The character carries a certain number of live vines: coupled with her natural ability to commune with plant life, they act as weaponry, or defensive/grabbing appendages. Their supply is, however, limited.

Beyond her metahuman traits, Ivy is shown to be exceptionally physically fit both due to gymnastics and her enhanced health; being both similar to Harley Quinn in skill as well as showing enough hand-to-hand combat prowess to challenge Batman without relying solely on her powers.

Pamela Isley is an expert in botany, toxicology and genetics. Though mentally unstable, she has a genius level of intelligence, particularly when it comes to anything related to plants, and she may be the world's foremost botanist. Her specialization in these fields had earned her a career as a scientist and she initially used her knowledge for perfumes, makeup and medicine. Additionally, her expertise in biochemistry has enabled her to develop mutant plants and to create and give life to plants that have long been thought to be extinct. In Batman" The Animated Series, a captive Batman calls her a genius combined with a fanatic – a description she does not dispute.

She is famous for being able to seduce men and women alike, often using her pheromones to do so, but also without: her beauty is a resource she can use. Pamela Isley has always been a beautiful woman, but she never used her looks or talents for personal gain until she became Poison Ivy.

Romantic relationships

Batman
Although Poison Ivy has been historically portrayed as a supervillainess, Batman and Poison Ivy have worked together in achieving common goals and are frequently depicted as having a romantic relationship. Batman's attraction to Ivy is present in some way in several mediums in which the characters appear. There has always been a sexual tension between the two, most notably in their canonical earlier encounters.

In her first appearance, Poison Ivy is established as having an attraction to Batman, and tries to convince Batman to join her side and creates love potions that ensnare him.

In the 1997 story Batman: Poison Ivy, Christopher DeJardin tries to kill Ivy, and Batman takes the bullet. Batman, who was wearing body armor, knocks him out. Ivy considers his saving her from death as proof he loves her, though he responds that she does not know the meaning of the word.

Her attraction is confirmed in Widening Gyre.

At first, Ivy's infatuation with Batman was one-sided; later stories presented the attraction as more mutual, but hindered by reluctance on Batman's part. She later kisses Bruce during a robbery, poisoning him. But when she subsequently kisses a dying Batman, she unknowingly cures her intended victim and establishes a budding romantic tension between them. During the "No Man's Land" arc, Batman comes to her rescue while she is held captive by Clayface, with Ivy remarking that she knew he would.

In Batman: Pavane (1989), while being interviewed as a potential candidate for the Suicide Squad, Pamela reveals to Inspector Stuart on how she became Poison Ivy. When she heard about Batman, she instantly fell in love with him—believing him to be the “perfect man”; going so far as to make a love shrine of him. With her goal set, she moved to Gotham, created a costume and renamed herself “Poison Ivy”; she then began committing crimes for the purpose of getting his attention in the hopes of them becoming the #1 crime couple. Unfortunately for Pamela, it didn't work out the way she wanted it to, and so she was apprehended and sent to Arkham Asylum.

In Batman: Hothouse (1992), Batman gains an obsession with Isley. Later, she kisses him. Now completely deranged, Ivy thinks herself "Titania, Queen of the May", and Batman her Oberon - as Batman struggles with the hallucinations induced by the kiss, she pins him down and prepares to unmask him. With his last burst of strength, Batman kicks the greenhouse's sprinklers on, washing away Ivy's pheromones. The sobered Batman chases an increasingly desperate Ivy onto the greenhouse's catwalks, where he barely manages to save Ivy from falling to her death. Subsequently, Ivy is returned to Arkham Asylum, her twisted love for Batman stronger than ever.

In one of the annuals of Batman: Shadow of the Bat, a mutual attraction between Poison Ivy and the Batman is obvious right from the start. Ivy considers Batman "the perfect man", and in a conversation with his butler, Alfred Pennyworth, he admits to finding her attractive and more appealing than Catwoman. She subsequently targets Bruce Wayne as one of those she blames for recent environmental 'crimes', giving him her poisoned kiss, but when she kisses Batman later and brags about how a second kiss is the antidote, Batman thus creates the impression that he is immune to her poisons.

In the Batman Chronicles (1995) story Passion's Fruit (1997), Ivy is depicted as feeling lonely and deeply missing Batman while at Arkham Asylum. She hatches a scheme to unleash some of her plant creations to cause havoc in Gotham, multiplying at contact with water, until Batman finally pays her a visit at the asylum. In exchange for the visit and a kiss, she morphs her creations into harmless strawberry plants. At the end of the story she is seen to be in improved spirits.
 
In the 2004 story Batman/Poison Ivy: Cast Shadows, Batman and Ivy work together to find a killer carrying out a series of Ivy-like murders at Arkham. His butler, Alfred Pennyworth, notes that Batman has been poisoned by the flowers. Batman tells Alfred he must kiss Poison Ivy for the cure, and that if he fails Alfred must kill him. Ivy and Batman confront each other, where Batman warns Ivy that he'll have to knock her out to kiss her to make sure that she doesn't kill him when he passes out after being cured. Ivy insists for him to trust her, despite Batman's doubts. Batman at first decides to punch her, hesitates, then they embrace and kiss passionately instead. Upon being cured, he falls, but saves himself, and saves Ivy as Gotham Tower collapses when — assuming Batman dead — Poison Ivy tries to kill herself, once more insinuating that it is more than just lust she feels for him. Ivy and Batman share a moment together speaking, watching her plant creations create light, and Batman compliments her on her talent. Batman takes Ivy back to Arkham Asylum, so that Ivy can finish her rehabilitation. Discouraged, Ivy complains to Batman about the lack of light in her cell, and Batman responds that there is nothing he can do about it, before departing. Transferred to a new cell the next morning, Ivy is stunned when she discovers that someone has had her room moved to a special cell where she can be in the sunlight, and has been filled with flowers as a gift. Upon being told some "anonymous benefactor" wanted to make sure her time isn't as daunting as it might have been, a touched Ivy smiles and thanks Batman.
 
In Detective Comics (vol. 2) #14 (January 2013), Ivy kisses Batman, trying to gain control over him via her toxins, and saying, “You're the only one for me Batman, you know that right? Nobody else even comes close. Not anybody.⁣⁣⁣” Rather than using an antidote, he rigs his visor to show him certain set of visual stimuli that will effectively erase his short-term memory, thereby erasing any commands she gives him as well. Aware of his resistance, she tries to appeal to his sense of morality.
 
In Gothtopia, Batman comes to her rescue when he realizes she was telling him the truth, even though he put her in Arkham. First she punches him for not believing her claims, and then she kisses him for coming to her rescue, poisoning him with her mind control toxin. Resisting it, he warns that they would be best off helping each other for now. Thanks to her own resistance and the kiss he received, both Batman and Ivy become immune to Scarecrow's gas effect.

In the 2021 Fear State Comic Series, Batman: 113 features an exploration into Batman's mind and shows Poison Ivy kissing him, along with both Catwoman and Talia al Ghul seemingly confirming towards a past relationship between the two characters in the current canon universe. 
 
The relationship even briefly deviated from the Batman/Ivy relationship into a Bruce/Pamela one when, in the comic series Batman: Gotham Knights, he helps her return to normal.

In Batman: The Long Halloween (film) Bruce and Ivy engage in a sexually implied relationship during the three month time period Bruce was under her mind control as instructed by mob boss Carmine Falcone

Harley Quinn
Prior to the New 52 reboot, Ivy is shown as teamed up on occasion with fellow villain Harley Quinn with Harley being her best friend and recurring ally. They are sometimes shown as romantically involved. Unlike most villain team-ups, their partnership is based on genuine friendship and mutual respect. Ivy sincerely wants to save Harley from her unhealthy abusive relationship with the Joker. Accordingly, Poison Ivy despises the Joker, and the two exchange vicious banter at every opportunity. In the final storyline of the Gotham City Sirens series, Harley suggests that Ivy may be in love with her, an accusation that stuns her. The following issue has Poison Ivy acknowledge that she may indeed love Harley, but the details of her love are never specified, and the series ended with the New 52 reboot before their relationship could be addressed.

In June 2015, Poison Ivy was revealed to be romantically involved with Harley Quinn by Harley Quinn series writers Jimmy Palmiotti and Amanda Conner, stating that she is in a romantic relationship with Harley "without the jealousy of monogamy".

In Harley Quinn (vol. 1) #8, Harley went on a vacation with Ivy to a nudist colony in which she tried to convince Ivy to move in with her, but while Ivy admitted that she loves Harley more than any other person on Earth and would love to spend as much time with her as possible, she is currently more dedicated to saving the environment. Harley was disappointed and very sad, but accepted it and the two parted with promises to meet again.

In Injustice 2 #70, which takes place in an alternate universe, Poison Ivy states that she was married to Harley Quinn.

Teams
Ivy teamed up on occasion with fellow villain, Harley Quinn with Harley being her close friend and recurring ally. The partnership between Harley and Ivy has also at times included Catwoman, such as in episodes and issues of the Gotham Girls webtoon and comic book series. In the mainstream DC Universe, the three formed an alliance in the pages of Gotham City Sirens.

Poison Ivy was invited to join the Birds of Prey by Black Canary in The New 52 continuity reboot. Katana and Starling reject the idea and even attack Ivy, but after a brief scuffle, the women begin working together as a team. She remained with the team for a time, but eventually betrayed them, shortly before the team split-up. When the Birds were reformed under the leadership of Batgirl, Poison Ivy was not invited back.

Poison Ivy joins Two-Face's gang for a short period of time during Batman: Dark Victory, when she murders crime boss Lucia Viti on Two-Face's orders. She is notably the only member of the gang to be upset by Two-Face's casual murder of fellow gang member Solomon Grundy, a plant-based entity. The gang is broken up after Two-Face's apparent death at the hands of the Joker.

Poison Ivy is a member of the original Injustice Gang of the World, which fights the Justice League on several occasions.
 
She joins the Secret Society of Super Villains for a mission against the Justice League. She later joins Alexander Luthor Jr.'s incarnation of the Society.

She is coerced into being a member of the Suicide Squad. During this time, she uses her abilities to enslave Count Vertigo.

Reception
IGN's list of the Top 100 Comic Book Villains of All Time ranked Poison Ivy as #64. She was ranked 21st in Comics Buyer's Guides "100 Sexiest Women in Comics" list.

Other versions

JLA: Created Equal
In JLA: Created Equal, Ivy and Swamp Thing team up to mentally travel through the Green, to try and discover what exactly caused the event which wiped out almost every male on the planet. But the trip is too much for her and it shatters her mind.

Batman: Crimson Mist
In Batman: Crimson Mist, Ivy is one of the many villains whom the now vampiric Batman kills for blood, the vampire Batman's presence causing her plants to wither around him as he gives Ivy the kiss she always wanted, commenting that he could only want her while in the darkness and decay of corruption. Her head is apparently left at GCPD headquarters after her demise.

Elseworlds
Poison Ivy was featured in some Elseworlds stories:

 In Batman & Demon: A Tragedy, Ivy is characterized as an elfen healer. She gives Bruce Wayne a cure for his night terrors, only to be slaughtered by Etrigan the Demon.
 In Justice League International Annual #5, published under the Elseworlds banner, Ivy is one of 10 superhumans who has made herself known to the public. In this story, Ivy has the power to seduce and control men, as well as the ability to secrete poison from her touch, willingly.

JLA/Avengers
In JLA/Avengers #3, Poison Ivy appears as a servant of Krona and attacks Aquaman and the Vision as a part of a group of villains. Poison Ivy strangles Aquaman in vines but is blasted by Iron Man and defeated.

Smallville
Poison Ivy is featured in the Smallville season 11 digital comic based on the TV series. During the "Lantern" arc, she is briefly featured as being a reciprocate of a Yellow Lantern ring and escaping Arkham Asylum. She is subdued by Batman and Nightwing.

Flashpoint
In the alternate timeline of the Flashpoint event, Poison Ivy is one of the many villains subsequently killed by Batman.

Batman '66
In Batman '66 (which is based on the 1960s TV series), Poison Ivy appears. In this continuity, Pamela Isley had botanist parents who started their own nursery called Isley Nursery and worked at a university. After her father Dr. Isley died from a toxic tropical plant, Pamela blamed the university that her father worked for as they did not bother to find an antidote for him. Upon moving back to the south with her mother, Pamela improved in her botany and became immune to the toxin that killed her father. With her new powers, she became Poison Ivy and committed crimes with her plants. Batman and Robin came across her while investigating Louie the Lilac's apparent demise.

Batman/Teenage Mutant Ninja Turtles
Ivy appears as one of the mutated Arkham inmates in the Batman/Teenage Mutant Ninja Turtles crossover. She was mutated into a humanoid mutant praying mantis.

Injustice: Gods Among Us/Injustice 2
In the tie-in comic to Injustice: Gods Among Us, Poison Ivy first appears in "Chapter 21" of Year Three, where Dick Grayson, now the new Deadman, possesses Ivy and has her drive the Batplane to the House of Mystery and House of Secrets, where Batman's Insurgency and Superman's Regime are doing battle. Before she can figure out where she is, she gets attacked by Swamp Thing as the 2 of them battle, before they stop and use their powers to save the forest from Trigon's hellfire. As Trigon and Mister Mxyzptlk's battle continues to tear reality apart, the 2 teams retreat into the respective houses, before Doctor Fate and Shazam stops them. Ivy then reappears in Year Four, where her best friend, Harley Quinn tries to convince her to commit a crime with her because she's bored, but Ivy refuses and suggests that Harley turn to someone else. Ivy then reappears in Ground Zero, where Harley calls her to recruit her for her gang, the Joker Clan, but Ivy refuses until Harley can stand up to Joker and since the Regime's peace, plant life is now prospering. Ivy then reappears at the end, where she shows up at Gary's funeral, much to Harley's surprise. Ivy then tries to convince Harley that they can run away together and be free, but Harley refuses to leave her gang behind until the war between the Regime and Insurgency is over, which Ivy accepts. The two of them then share a kiss before Ivy leaves, wishing Harley good luck.

In the tie-in comic to Injustice 2, one year after the Regime's fall, Poison Ivy joins Ra's al Ghul and his team for the purpose of creating a better world for The Green. The comic establishes that Ivy and Harley were a couple, and issue #70 hints that the two got married in Las Vegas.

Batman: White Knight
Poison Ivy has a minor appearance in the 2017 series Batman: White Knight. Ivy, along with several other Batman villains, is tricked by Jack Napier (who in this reality was a Joker who had been force fed an overdose of pills by Batman which temporarily cured him of his insanity) into drinking drinks that had been laced with particles from Clayface's body. This was done so that Napier, who was using Mad Hatter's technology to control Clayface, could control them by way of Clayface's ability to control parts of his body that had been separated from him. Ivy and the other villains are then used to attack a library which Napier himself was instrumental in building in one of Gotham City’s poorer districts. Later on in the story, the control hat is stolen by Neo-Joker (the second Harley Quinn, who felt that Jack Napier was a pathetic abnormality while Joker was the true, beautiful personality), in an effort to get Napier into releasing the Joker persona. Poison Ivy also appears in the sequel storyline Batman: Curse of the White Knight, however she managed to escape the massacre of the other villains by Azrael.

Harley Quinn: Breaking Glass
Poison Ivy appears as a supporting character in the 2019 graphic novel Harley Quinn: Breaking Glass. This version of the character is an Afro-Asian American student activist and member of Gotham High's film club by name of Ivy Du-Barry. She eventually ends up befriended by Harleen Quinzel, who has been sent to live in Gotham City by her mother.

In other media

Television

Live action
 Poison Ivy appears in the live-action TV series Gotham, portrayed by Clare Foley (initially), Maggie Geha in season 3–4, and then by Peyton List in season 4's second half to season 5. This version is named Ivy Pepper and is depicted as the young daughter of Mario Pepper, a mentally unstable petty criminal who is framed for the murder of Thomas and Martha Wayne. In the pilot episode, Detective Harvey Bullock kills her father during a shootout. Stricken with grief, her mother commits suicide and she is adopted by a couple who renames her "Pamela". After running away from her adoptive family, she befriends Selina Kyle, and becomes a skilled chemist, using plants and herbs to create mind-altering chemicals. In Season 3, Ivy has a brief encounter with Subject 514A and gets caught by Fish Mooney's minion Nancy when she tries to warn Selina. When Mooney unleashes the minion Marv on Ivy, she tries to get away. Marv's brief touch on Ivy accelerates her aging process until she transforms into a beautiful woman in her 20s after she fell into a sewer drain. After her transformation, she uses her beauty - and a pheromonal perfume - to seduce and rob wealthy men. Ivy eventually teams up with Oswald Cobblepot and helps form "an army of freaks", which includes Mr. Freeze and Firefly. At the end of the season, Penguin has Ivy and Freeze cryogenically freeze Edward Nygma, where she then helps Penguin build his new club, the Iceberg Lounge. In season 4, Ivy becomes tired of not being taken seriously and breaks into an apothecary shop and steals and drinks some mystical chemicals from the owner's safe, enhancing her abilities further. She later emerges from a cocoon with a completely new appearance and the ability to poison people with just a scratch from her nails. Ivy did perfect an antidote to this condition which she tested on Selina Kyle who agrees to help Ivy with her next plot. Later, Pamela would confront a hungover Bruce Wayne and for the first time, uses her signature mind-controlling kiss on him, alluding to the characters classic methods from the comics. She extracts the information of Project M from him and leaves him in a near fatal hallucinogenic state. After abducting Lucius Fox following her light poisoning of Bruce Wayne, she has Lucius take her to where Project M is located where it was revealed to be water from the Lazarus Pit. Though she managed to use some leverage to get away from Gordon, she did leave an antidote for Bruce Wayne in Lucius' coat pocket. Ivy then enacts a plan to exact revenge on those who have wronged her, starting with Bullock, who killed her father on the job. Ivy comes to the bar where he works and poisons his employees. She then uses her mind control on him and orders him to call Gordon and then himself, though Gordon manages to break him out of the spell. After this, Ivy goes to the Wayne Foundation party with her new gang of mind controlled minions and holds everyone hostage. She poisons one wealthy man, before Gordon interrupts her and she orders her guards to kill everyone. She returns home to find Selina. They battle for the Lazarus water which Selina ends up destroying. As they were about to kill each other, they decide to go their separate ways hoping to never cross each other's paths. Ivy flees and is assumed to have gone into hiding. In the episode "Trespassers", Ivy has taken refuge in Robinson Park after Gotham City was declared No Man's Land. After Bruce helped to deal with her captors and revealing that the plants are feeding off the humans, Ivy gives Bruce a plant that would help deal with Selina's spinal injury. In the episode "The Trial of Jim Gordon", Ivy plans to prevent Gotham from reunifying with the mainland by ruining the water supply, cover the city in her plants, and get revenge for her father's death. She hypnotizes Victor Zsasz into shooting Gordon, critically injuring him. Ivy also hypnotizes Bruce and Fox into shutting down the river's treatment facility, but Selina frees them and helps stop the shutdown. Ivy goes the GCPD precinct to kill Gordon while he is recovering. Leslie Thompkins shoots her in the abdomen and Ivy escapes, having all aspects of her plan fail.
 Poison Ivy is featured in the TV series set in the Arrowverse, both portrayed by Bridget Regan and Nicole Kang respectively:
 Her name appears in Lex Luthor's journal in the Supergirl episode "Crime and Punishment".
 In the Arrowverse crossover event "Crisis on Infinite Earths", the second part shows a plant can be seen in a glass case of Earth-99 Batman's "Trophies" collected from villains he has killed. It can be assumed that this plant belongs to Poison Ivy.
 In Batwoman, Poison Ivy is in a relationship with Renee Montoya, then a beat cop studying to become a detective in the GCPD. A former scientist who was experimented on by her colleague Mark LeGand, Ivy plots to flood a portion of Gotham, rendering it unhabitable by humans, and tries to convince Montoya to leave the city with her. Unwilling to turn Ivy in, Montoya injects her with a chemical that places her body into a form of suspended animation. In the episode "Kane, Kate", a brainwashed Kate Kane stole Batman's trophies belonging to his enemies from the Batcave which includes Poison Ivy's vine. In the season 2 finale episode "Power", her vine was thrown into the Gotham River along with Penguin's umbrella and the Mad Hatter's hat and seen reaching the shore before starting to grow. The vine went on and infected Mary Hamilton with some of Poison Ivy's essence assuming a similar mantle that Alice later dubbed "Poison Mary". Poison Ivy subsequently appears in "Trust Destiny" where her flashback is seen and her body has been kept deep in the Batcave away from water and sunlight. After the formula was harvested from her, Renee secretly made off with her body and dumped it in a nearby lake. In the episode "Meet Your Maker", Poison Ivy kills some nature violators in a national park while seeing that she is not back to full power. Renee tries to get through to her to no avail even when Poison Mary shows up. After Renee leaves, Poison Ivy embraces Poison Mary as she is brought back to full power. In the episode "Toxic", Pamela plans on destroying the Gotham Dam and flooding the city. Her plans are stopped by a de-powered Mary Hamilton, Batwoman, and Batwing. The episode ends with her on a plane with Montoya en route to the country of Coryana where nature is preserved and industry is almost non-existent.
In Riverdale, Poison Ivy's costume is worn by the character Cheryl Blossom (Madelaine Petsch) in the episode titled "Chapter Sixty-One: Halloween" as a reference to the comic book miniseries Harley & Ivy Meet Betty & Veronica.

Animation

DC Animated Universe

 Poison Ivy appears in series set in the DC Animated Universe, voiced by Diane Pershing: 
 In Batman: The Animated Series, Poison Ivy first appears in "Pretty Poison", in which she makes an assassination attempt on Harvey Dent with a poisonous kiss as retribution for construction over the last habitat of a rare flower. In the earlier days, her metahuman characteristics were downplayed; the only superpower she displays is a hyper-immune system that makes her immune to toxins but has also left her infertile. She does not have direct control over plants, instead breeding special plants she uses for her crimes, along with using chemistry and a wrist-mounted crossbow.
 In The New Batman Adventures, Poison Ivy was aesthetically revamped to look more plant-like, having light green skin and a skimpier outfit that exposes her legs. She also became more humorous and seductive in personality, coinciding with her genuinely friendly relationship with Harley Quinn. Her fanatical mindset regarding the despoiling of plants and the ecosphere was also greatly reduced.
 Although Poison Ivy does not appear in Batman Beyond, a stage actress playing her in the play The Legend of Batman appears in the episode "Out of the Past". When asked about Poison Ivy's fate, Paul Dini stated that she moved to South America and took over the Amazon rainforest, becoming part of it.
 Poison Ivy returns in Static Shock episode "Hard As Nails". She and Harley Quinn open a 'support and cure' website that would lure female metahumans to Gotham, claiming that it can cure metahumans. When Static pursues a classmate that calls herself Nails to Gotham, Static ended up running into Batman and ended up ambushed by Harley and Ivy. When it came to a heist upon a ship carrying gold, she and Harley double-cross Nails only for Static and Batman to save her.
 Poison Ivy had a co-starring role in the web series Gotham Girls, in which she joins forces with Harley Quinn and Catwoman.
 An alternate version of Poison Ivy appears in the Justice League episode "A Better World". This version was lobotomized by the Justice Lords, and is now a prisoner and gardener at Arkham Asylum. Bruce Timm stated that he had turned down pitches for Poison Ivy episodes on Justice League to focus on new characters and storylines, only bringing back a minimal number of villains from previous shows.

Other series
 Poison Ivy appears in The Batman, voiced by Piera Coppola. This incarnation has a different origin and rose-like hairstyle and dress as well as ties to Barbara Gordon. Due to her younger age, the seductive side of her personality was heavily dialed back. Pamela Isley is a high school student and environmental activist. Despite Jim Gordon's protests, she was repeatedly sentenced to a youth detention center for delinquent acts during her protests. She convinces Barbara to help her with scouting polluting companies for her hired mercenary, the corporate saboteur Temblor (voiced by Jim Cummings) by claiming they were "protests". During one such mission, Isley is doused with a plant-based mutagen called "chlorogene" during a battle between Temblor and Batman that gives her power over plants. She swiftly puts her powers towards furthering her eco-terrorist career and takes the 'Poison Ivy' name before being stopped by Batman and Barbara as Batgirl. In the fifth-season premiere, she is forced into helping Lex Luthor take control of Superman by combining her spores with Kryptonite dust.
 Poison Ivy appears in Batman: The Brave and the Bold, voiced by Jennifer Hale in "Chill of the Night!" and Vanessa Marshall in "The Mask of Matches Malone!" Prior to her appearances in the show, she was mentioned in "Rise of the Blue Beetle!" in a conversation between Jaime Reyes and Paco. In "Chill of the Night!", Poison Ivy appears among other villains in an auction for a supersonic weapon held by arms dealer Joe Chill. After Chill demands their protection after being attacked by Batman and admitting his involvement in creating him, the villains try to kill him, though Batman stops them. Poison Ivy later appears in the teaser for "The Mask of Matches Malone!". She and her army of 'Flower Children' henchwomen kidnap Batman so she can seduce him into becoming her king. After he refuses, she orders her guards to feed Batman to a giant Venus Flytrap. Before the creature can consume him, Black Orchid comes to his rescue; freeing Batman and working together to defeat Poison Ivy. She also appears in the opening of "Crisis 22,300 Miles Above the Earth!", in which she is present at Batman's roast. Poison Ivy later makes cameos in "Knights of Tomorrow!", "Joker: The Vile and the Villainous!", and "Mitefall!".
 Poison Ivy appears in Young Justice, voiced by Alyssa Milano. This version is a member of the Injustice League. In the episode "Revelations", Poison Ivy works with her teammates to create a massive plant creature to attack various cities across the globe, with the intention of extorting a hefty ransom from the United Nations. Robin and Miss Martian successfully destroy the creature, and the Injustice League members are soon apprehended by the Justice League.
 Poison Ivy appears in Super Best Friends Forever. She is seen in the second animated short "Time Waits for No Girl".
 Poison Ivy appears in Robot Chicken DC Comics Special 2: Villains in Paradise, voiced by Clare Grant. This version is part of the Legion of Doom.
 Poison Ivy appears in the web series DC Super Hero Girls, voiced by Tara Strong. This version is a hero and student at Super Hero High.
 Poison Ivy appears in Teen Titans Go!. She has a cameo appearance in the episode "The Titans Show" and returns later in "Mo' Money Mo' Problems".
 Poison Ivy appears in Justice League Action, voiced by Natasha Leggero. In the episode "Garden of Evil", she takes Swamp Thing on a blind date to control him into helping her overrun Gotham with her monstrous plants after Harley Quinn threw a serum on them. While Batman worked on an antidote, Superman and Firestorm work to fight Swamp Thing while Vixen fights Harley Quinn. While Poison Ivy and Swamp Thing were holding their wedding, Superman and Firestorm fight them until Batman arrives to dose Poison Ivy with a chemical to negate her abilities. After the monstrous plants are returned to normal, Batman takes Poison Ivy back to Arkham Asylum.
 Poison Ivy is a main character in Harley Quinn, voiced by Lake Bell. This version is much more sarcastic, cynical and modest, and the typically sultry aspects of her character have been toned down. Ivy is portrayed as Harley Quinn's best friend as she supports her in her goal of getting out of the Joker's shadow and becoming an independent supervillain, often acting as a voice of reason for Harley even though the latter never listens to her. In addition, she also has a talking man-eating plant named Frank (voiced by J. B. Smoove), whom she keeps as a pet and roommate. In the episode "The Line", she starts dating Kite Man, with their relationship developing over the course of the series, to the point where he asks her to marry him and she accepts. In the episode "Devil's Snare", the Joker murders her by shooting her with a giant harpoon, though she is resurrected by the following episode via the renewing power of nature. In the episode "All the Best Inmates Have Daddy Issues", it is revealed that Ivy had a difficult childhood with her abusive father, which had been alluded-to earlier in "Harley Quinn Highway". She was also an introverted, fervent misanthrope until Harley helped her change for the better. In the episode "There's No Place to Go But Down", Ivy and Harley share their first kiss, though the former plays it off as excitement from escaping a near-death situation while the latter secretly develops feelings for her. Over the course of the following episodes, they end up having sex twice during Ivy's bachelorette party, but Ivy chooses to stay with Kite Man. While preparing for the wedding however, Doctor Psycho uses his psionic powers to brainwash her so he force her to kill Harley. However, she kisses Ivy a second time, distracting Psycho long enough to break his hold over her and allow Harley to give Ivy an anti-mind control device created by Kite Man and Sy Borgman. Though Ivy and Harley defeat Psycho, he retaliates by showing the memory Ivy had of her and Harley having sex to everyone in Gotham, including a shocked Kite Man. In the season two finale, "The Runaway Bridesmaid", Ivy reconciles with Kite Man and tries to continue on with the wedding, but after Harley saves them from the GCPD, Kite Man realizes Ivy does not reciprocate his feelings and breaks up with her. While escaping from Commissioner Gordon together, Ivy admits her feelings for Harley and they share a kiss. In the sequel comic series Harley Quinn: The Animated Series: The Eat. Bang! Kill. Tour the two go on an extended sort-of-but-not-a honeymoon to work through their feelings for each other, apologize to the friends they got arrested at Ivy's wedding, and fight various heroes and villains. Season 3 of the animated series features Harley and her working out their romantic relationship with positive results until she dons her classical signature outfit made of flora as she intends to turn everyone in Gotham into plantlike zombies along with turning the entire place back into the wilderness. The both of them are shown to have different goals at the end of the season as Harley wants to join the bat family in crimefighting while she intends to work for Lex Luthor as a super villain but promise to keep in touch as a couple.
 Poison Ivy appears in the TV series DC Super Hero Girls, voiced by Cristina Milizia. This version is a lonely girl who deeply cares for plants, refusing to eat vegetables, though she has a voracious craving for meat. She hates people who harm the environment, often endangering people in her anger. She finds other people annoying, like Jessica Cruz. She also does not care about what others think about her. In the episode "#DetentionClub," she reveals that her father has been missing for ten years; he created a unique plant for her that blooms only once a decade, and it last did so on the day she last saw him.
 Poison Ivy will appear in Batwheels, voiced by Kailey Snider.

Film

Live-action
 Poison Ivy appears in Batman & Robin, portrayed by Uma Thurman. This version is a botanist, working for Wayne Enterprises' arboreal preservation project in South America, and experimenting with Venom to create animal-plant cross-breedings capable of fighting back and protecting the world's plants. However, her senior colleague, Jason Woodrue, steals some of her Venom samples to transform a prisoner into Bane. Isley is outraged that her research has been corrupted, and when she rejects Woodrue's advances, he tries to murder her by sending her crashing into shelves lined with beakers containing Venom and other animal-plant toxins and chemicals. She is transformed into a poisonous hybrid of human and plant. Replacing her blood with aloe, her skin with chlorophyll and filled her lips with venom, making her kiss poisonous. She kills Woodrue by kissing him with her poisonous lips, and vows to establish botanical supremacy over the world. She allies herself with Bane and Mr. Freeze, and plans to freeze the Earth with a giant freezing cannon, which will destroy the human race and enable Poison Ivy's mutant plants to "overrun the globe". She ensures Freeze's cooperation by pulling the plug on his cryogenically frozen wife, and convincing him that Batman had done it. Ivy then lures an infatuated Robin to her garden hideout and tries to kill him with a venomous kiss; the attempt fails, however, as Robin had coated his lips with rubber. A furious Ivy throws Robin into her lily pond and entangles Batman in her vines, but they are able to free themselves when Batgirl unexpectedly arrives and traps the villainess in her own floral throne. After Batman, Robin and Batgirl foil the villains' plan, Ivy is imprisoned in Arkham Asylum with a vengeful Freeze as her cellmate.
 Birds of Prey director Cathy Yan wanted to do a sequel that could have explored the relationship between both Quinn and Ivy. Poison Ivy was going to appear in Gotham City Sirens with Quinn and Catwoman but the film has currently been put on hold.
 Matt Reeves, director and writer of the 2022 film The Batman, has stated his hope to include Poison Ivy as a potential villain for a sequel, alongside Mr. Freeze, the Court of Owls, Mad Hatter, Calendar Man, or Hush as other potential candidates.

Animation
 Poison Ivy is one of the many villains broken out of Arkham by the Joker and Lex Luthor in Lego Batman: The Movie - DC Super Heroes Unite. She, along with the rest of the rogues gallery, battles with Batman and Robin but is recaptured before escaping the grounds.
 The Batman: Arkham franchise version of Poison Ivy makes a cameo appearance in Batman: Assault on Arkham. When the Joker releases all the inmates at the Asylum, Ivy goes to the greenhouse. Two guards are there and she approaches them and users her vines on them. Later, she kisses guards and inmates with her mind control-lipstick, to possess other inmates to do her bidding and escape from Arkham.
 Poison Ivy appears in Lego DC Comics Super Heroes: Justice League: Gotham City Breakout with Vanessa Marshall reprising her role from Batman: The Brave and the Bold. She is among the villains unintentionally broken out of Arkham by Superman. She uses her pheromones to paralyze Superman, Wonder Woman and Cyborg. She is last seen towards the end of the movie robbing a florist shop until Wonder Woman sends her back to Arkham.
 Poison Ivy appears in The Lego Batman Movie, voiced by Riki Lindhome. She is a member of The Rogues, a team of Gotham's primary supervillains formed by the Joker. During the battle at the Gotham Energy facility, she tries to kiss Batman, only for Batman to block it with several of the Penguin's hench-penguins, whom she continues to kiss and poison. She is sent to Arkham Asylum with the rest of the Rogues after Joker forces everyone to turn themselves in. She is later broken out to assist Batman in defeating the Joker, Harley Quinn and the army of Uber villains. They manage to succeed and, in celebration, she kisses a man, which accidentally poisons him. She and the Rogues reconcile with Joker and leave, with Batman giving them a thirty-minute head start.
 Poison Ivy appears in Batman and Harley Quinn, voiced by Paget Brewster. She teams up with Floronic Man to unleash a virus that will turn everyone on Earth into plant hybrids. To track her down, Batman recruits Ivy's best friend, Harley Quinn. Ultimately, Harley is able to convince Ivy that her plan could endanger all life on Earth, though Floronic Man knocks her out and tries to finish what they started anyway.
 The Brave and the Bold version of Poison Ivy appears in Scooby-Doo! & Batman: The Brave and the Bold, voiced by Tara Strong.
 A Victorian era version of Poison Ivy appears Batman: Gotham by Gaslight, voiced by Kari Wuhrer. This version is an exotic dancer and opium addict who was looked after by Sister Leslie. She is murdered by Jack the Ripper after trying to seduce him in an alley way.
 Poison Ivy appears in the film Lego DC Comics Super Heroes: The Flash, voiced again by Vanessa Marshall. She has her plants go on a rampage to eat the civilians to get back at them for eating salad when Firestorm appears to stop her and turns her plants into ice cream. Unfortunately, she fights back and knocks him into the ice cream. Then Reverse-Flash appears, cages her, and turns her plants into a parade float, making her the first of the many villains he captures to win the hearts of the citizens.
 A Feudal Japan version of Poison Ivy appears in the anime film Batman Ninja, voiced by Atsuko Tanaka and Tara Strong in Japanese and English respectively.
Poison Ivy appears in Justice League vs. the Fatal Five. She is locked in Arkham Asylum and escapes briefly, along with Harley. The two of them battle Batman and the guards until they are subdued. Both were voiced by an uncredited Tara Strong.
 Poison Ivy appears in Batman vs. Teenage Mutant Ninja Turtles with Tara Strong reprising the role. Unlike the comics where she is mutated into a humanoid mantis, she instead becomes a mutant plant monster. However, she is unable to fight Robin, Raphael, and Michelangelo because she is rooted in the ground and cannot reach them. 
 Poison Ivy appears in Batman: Hush, voiced by Peyton List reprising her role from Gotham. Like in the original comic storyline, Ivy works under the employment of new supervillain Hush, and uses her mind-control to briefly force Catwoman to steal for her. Provided Kryptonite by Hush, Ivy then travels to Metropolis and takes control of Superman to kill Batman, although he and Catwoman break Superman out of her control. Once defeated, Ivy is forced to divulge information about Hush, and is subsequently arrested. 
 Poison Ivy appears in Batman: The Long Halloween, voiced by Katee Sackhoff. Unlike other characters in the film, Poison Ivy's design bears little resemblance to her counterpart in the original story, instead coming closer to modern depictions. She makes her first appearance in the post-credits scene of Part 1, joining Carmine Falcone at his son Alberto's funeral. Using her powers, she takes control of Bruce Wayne when he shakes her hand. In Part 2, Ivy uses her control over Bruce to force him to sign over assets over to the Falcones, unintentionally keeping him from investigating the Holiday murders as Batman. Three months later, Catwoman puts and end to Ivy's manipulations and defeats her, sending her to Arkham Asylum. Later on, Two-Face and Solomon Grundy free Arkham's supervillain inmates to help with the latter's revenge against Carmine, with Ivy, Mad Hatter and Scarecrow attacking the streets to distract the GCPD. During the final battle, Ivy captures both Batman and Catwoman and tries to use her mind-control again, but Batman resists, knocking Ivy out.

Video games
Poison Ivy has appeared in most of the Batman video games over the years. In most of these games, she does not fight Batman directly and usually watches in the background while Batman fights one of her plant monsters. She appeared as a boss in:
 Batman: The Animated Series for the Game Boy
 The Adventures of Batman & Robin for the Super NES.
 The Adventures of Batman & Robin for the Sega CD.
 Batman: Chaos in Gotham
 Batman and Robin, the video game adaptation of the movie.
 Batman Vengeance
 Batman: Dark Tomorrow She appears as a boss in the Arkham Asylum level, if Batman is caught in the vines of her plant monster, she will kill him with her poisoned kiss.
 Poison Ivy has two cameo appearances in Batman: Rise of Sin Tzu, first as a hallucination induced by the Scarecrow, and later as an imprisoned inmate of Arkham Asylum.
 In Batman: Gotham City Racer, Poison Ivy's vehicle was playable.
 Poison Ivy appears in DC Universe Online, voiced by Cyndi Williams. Sketches of her are viewable on the official website.
 Poison Ivy is a playable character in the multiplayer online battle arena game Infinite Crisis, with Tasia Valenza reprising her role from the Batman: Arkham series.
 Poison Ivy was added as a cosmetic outfit in Fortnite.

Lego DC series 
 Poison Ivy is a playable character in Lego Batman: The Videogame, voiced again by Vanessa Marshall. She also works for the Riddler, and is the fourth boss of the level "The Riddler's Revenge." She appears in the hero story right after Two-Face is defeated where she aids in the Riddler's escape from Batman and Robin by dropping a seed right in front of him and making a giant vine grow under his feet, lifting him onto a rooftop where Poison Ivy stands. In the Riddler's side of the story, the Riddler assigns her to get some mutated vine seeds from the Botanic Gardens. The two of them attempt to sneak past Commissioner Gordon. However, the Riddler learns the hard way that stepping on flowers provokes her, and makes her yell at him, getting Commissioner Gordon's attention. After they get the seeds, she stays with the plants, and plays with them, including hugging a tree and lying in falling, red flowers that form into a heart, but not before giving the Riddler the seeds. Back in Batman's side of the story, the dynamic duo finds her, and she drops 3 seeds on the ground; one of them grows into a tiny plant that barks like a puppy dog, but when Robin aims at it, it grows into a giant plant with Poison Ivy riding inside of it, starting the boss fight. The other seeds grow into monster plants as well, and they spit out seeds that become Poison Ivy's goons, and either hero has to attack them until they become lego pieces that they need to use to build bombs to blow one of the plants up (but the explosions can hurt the heroes too) and Poison Ivy moves into another. After the second plant blows up, Poison Ivy doesn't move into the third one, but she can't be damaged until that one blows up. After all her goons are gone, she can defeated simply by attacking her. After she's defeated, she appears to be injured, and Robin has compassion on her, and attempts to check on her. Unfortunately, it turns out to be a trick, and she has a flower spray love gas at him which makes him fall in love with her. Batman throws a Batarang at her, and tries to make Robin snap out of the love gas (which he does by himself when they chase the Riddler). In the ending cutscene, Poison Ivy is seen in her cell in Arkham Asylum caring for plants.
 Poison Ivy appears in Lego Batman 2: DC Super Heroes, voiced by Laura Bailey. In the third level, "Arkham Asylum Antics", she rides around on Bane's Mole Machine along with the Penguin and Bane himself. She appears as an optional boss. Once again, she is fought at the Botanic Gardens. Before the fight, she whips a vine around and says, "It's time to go green."
 Poison Ivy appears as a playable character in Lego Batman 3: Beyond Gotham, voiced by Tara Strong. She appears in side quests alongside Swamp Thing. A trophy on the PlayStation 3 version, "Queens of Crime," requires the player to set both free play characters as her & Harley Quinn. This is also the first & currently only Lego Batman game that doesn't feature her as a boss.
 Poison Ivy appears in Lego Dimensions. She is featured in The Lego Batman Movie adventure pack as the second boss. She is voiced once again by Tasia Valenza.
 Poison Ivy appears as a both a main character and a boss in Lego DC Super-Villains, voiced again by Tasia Valenza. She first appears in the level “The Harley and the Ivy”, where The Rookie, Deadshot, Captain Boomerang, and Killer Frost head to Botanic Gardens to recruit her to help the Legion of Doom, but she mistakes them for trespassing and attacks. However, they eventually tell her it was all a misunderstanding and she helps them get to the top of the Gala Communications Tower so Harley Quinn can show proof that the Crime Syndicate of America are actually villains using her phone.

Batman: Arkham

Poison Ivy appears in the Batman: Arkham series, voiced primarily by Tasia Valenza. 
 Poison Ivy makes her first appearance in Batman: Arkham Asylum. This iteration's appearance is revamped to a naked-goddess persona, wearing only an orange prison-issued shirt and foliage panties, and her appearance is also more plant-like, having green skin and plant growths on her body. She acts as the penultimate boss. She first appears in the Penitentiary, begging to be released from her cell so she can help her "babies"; she can apparently feel the pain Doctor Young inflicted on the island's plants while creating a Venom-plant hybrid to create the Titan drug. She is later released by Harley Quinn, after which she makes a beeline for the Botanical Gardens. Batman later tracks her down. After some convincing (by way of crushing one of her vines when it tries to attack), she tells Batman that the molds growing in Killer Croc's lair can be used to create a Titan antidote. After Batman leaves, the Joker arrives and gives Poison Ivy a double-dose of Titan, causing her plants to sprout up randomly and grow to massive proportions, wreaking havoc across the island and destroying the makeshift Batcave in the sewer systems. When Batman returns to stop her, Poison Ivy attacks with ground vines, spore projectiles, hypnotized guards, and an enormous mutated plant-monster. Batman eventually defeats her, and she can later be seen being returned to her cell.
 Poison Ivy makes her next appearance in Batman: Arkham City. Her design remains the same except for a crimson colored shirt. She has taken up residence in an abandoned hotel within Arkham City's districts, isolating herself from humanity and relying on thugs seduced with plant toxins for protection. Late in the game's storyline, Poison Ivy forges a shaky alliance with Catwoman in return for an unusual favor following a brief fight. She promises support from mutated plants if Catwoman will break into Hugo Strange's heavily guarded TYGER vault and recover a rare flower which was seized from her upon incarceration. After the player has successfully completed this stage however, Catwoman spitefully reneges on their agreement by destroying the plant rather than attempt escape with it. Poison Ivy is misled into blaming Strange for this calamity and subsequently swears revenge on Gotham City. Her plant shop she owned in her former life can also be located in Arkham City, serving an actual purpose during one of Catwoman's gameplay missions. Poison Ivy also appears in Batman: Arkham City Lockdown, voiced by Amy Carle.
 Pamela Isley is alluded in Batman: Arkham Origins. She is hinted at when the player locates a plant shop owned by her. It is assumed she has yet to undergo her Poison Ivy transformation during this game's time period. The DLC "Cold Cold Heart" also alluded to her via her ID at GothCorp's check-in area.
 Poison Ivy next appears in Batman: Arkham Knight. Her design has been altered: her long hair has been cut short and tied above her head, her pigmentation is now a light tint of the color, giving her a more human appearance. Originally, as seen in Harley Quinn's story mission, she was first imprisoned at the Blüdhaven police station, but was soon rescued when Harley fought the entire police department, as well as Nightwing. Poison Ivy attended Scarecrow's meeting with the other villains, but refused to join in. As a result, Scarecrow had her knocked out and placed in gas chamber to have the new Fear Toxin used on her. However, Batman knocks out the guards and Poison Ivy proves immune to the toxin, allowing Batman to take her to the Isolation Cell at the GCPD. Batman is forced to work with her to stop Scarecrow's citywide fear toxin by helping her awaken two ancient trees that had long since gone dormant. She helps save the city, but dies in the process. Later in the game, a red flower can be found on the location of her death.

Injustice
 Poison Ivy is alluded in Injustice: Gods Among Us. One of her poisonous plants is an interactable item in the Arkham Asylum stage. Poison Ivy is seen as an unplayable support card in the game's iOS version depicted with her New 52 look, and is mentioned on different S.T.A.R. Labs missions. 
 Poison Ivy appears as a playable character in Injustice 2, once again voiced by Tasia Valenza. In the game's story mode, she allies herself with the Society to take over the planet, disappointed that Batman's reform from the Regime wasn't environmentally friendly. She battles her fellow Gotham City Sirens, Harley Quinn and Catwoman (or Cyborg depending on who the player chooses). In her single player ending, Poison Ivy makes Brainiac collect every city on Earth, then fatally kisses Brainiac, killing the Coluan with her poison. She then uses the Earth's plant life to rule the planet, massacring most of the heroes in the process, although she is visibly shown to have spared both Harley Quinn and Batman.

Miscellaneous
 Poison Ivy appears in "The Flower Girl", a story in Batman Adventures vol. 2, #16. In the story, Poison Ivy is dying from the effects of her own toxins, and makes her way to Dr. Holland, who is practicing science in a remote rural cottage. She pleads with Holland to save her life, but he explains to her that there is nothing he can do. Shortly after, she dies in his arms, and collapses into a pile of dead plants. Moments later, another Pamela Isley, whose character design matches her appearance in Batman: The Animated Series, appears. She states that the Ivy who died is a vegetable creature that she had created as a distraction for Batman to start a new life.
 The character also co-starred in the three-issue comic book miniseries Harley and Ivy, and was given her swan song in The Batman Adventures comic book series, which contains stories about Batman's adventures in Gotham City after a break from the Justice League.
 Poison Ivy is portrayed by Jaime Lyn Beatty in StarKid Productions' web-musical, Holy Musical B@man!.
 Poison Ivy also appears in the Catwoman novel, part of the DC Icons series.

See also
 List of Batman family enemies

References

Further reading
 Daniels, Les. Batman: The Complete History. Chronicle Books, 1999. 
 Beatty, Scott, et al., The Batman Handbook: The Ultimate Training Manual. Quirk Books, 2005. 
Baney, Jennifer. Poison Ivy's green screen debut: A rhetorical criticism on erasing identity on screen. University of the Pacific, Thesis. Poison Ivy's green screen debut: A rhetorical criticism on erasing identity on screen
Checkett, John-David. The Green Goddess Returns: Batman's Poison Ivy as a Symbol of emergent Ecofeminist Consciousnes. Florida Atlantic University, Thesis. Green Goddess returns: Batman's Poison Ivy as a symbol of emerging ecofeminist consciousness | fau.digital.flvc.org

External links
 Poison Ivy at Comic Vine

Batman characters
Villains in animated television series
Characters created by Robert Kanigher
Characters created by Sheldon Moldoff
Comics characters introduced in 1966
Female characters in animation
Female characters in film
Female characters in television
Female film villains
DC Comics characters with accelerated healing
DC Comics female superheroes
DC Comics female supervillains
DC Comics LGBT superheroes
DC Comics LGBT supervillains
DC Comics metahumans
DC Comics plant characters
DC Comics scientists
DC Comics television characters
DC Comics orphans
Fictional biochemists
Fictional bisexual females
Fictional botanists
Fictional characters from Seattle
Fictional characters with plant abilities
Fictional characters with slowed ageing
Fictional conservationists and environmentalists
Fictional eco-terrorists
Fictional female murderers
Fictional female scientists
Fictional geneticists
Fictional hypnotists and indoctrinators
Fictional LGBT characters in television
Fictional bisexuals
Fictional life scientists
Fictional mad scientists
Fictional professional thieves
Fictional rampage and spree killers
Fictional toxicologists
LGBT characters in animated television series
Fighting game characters
Action film villains
 
Superhero film characters
Video game bosses